Dênis Marinho (born 21 January 1963) is a Brazilian rower. He competed at the 1984 Summer Olympics and the 1988 Summer Olympics.

References

External links
 

1963 births
Living people
Brazilian male rowers
Olympic rowers of Brazil
Rowers at the 1984 Summer Olympics
Rowers at the 1988 Summer Olympics
Rowers from Paris
Pan American Games medalists in rowing
Pan American Games silver medalists for Brazil
Rowers at the 1983 Pan American Games
Rowers at the 1987 Pan American Games